Batman is a video game developed by Sunsoft and released for the Sega Genesis in 1990. It was inspired by the 1989 Tim Burton-directed Batman film. The game is more faithful to the film's plot than the NES game of the game name and includes levels in which the player controls Batman's vehicles.

Development
The music was composed by Naoki Kodaka  who also wrote the music for the NES game.

Reception

IGN gave the game a review score of 6/10 saying that "Sunsoft's Batman accurately recreates the movie and it was certainly a welcome treat after seeing the import featured in early gaming rags. Unfortunately, the game is too short and not especially challenging." The game holds an aggregate score of 70% on GameRankings. Mega Play’s four reviewers gave Batman very positive reviews and giving praised to the game’s graphics and gameplay, although they commented that the game is not as challenging and the gameplay is a little slow. Console XS gave an overall review score of 82% writing: "It may get a tad boring, but the accurate graphics hold things together." Mega Action gave a review score of 83% and praised the game’s graphics. Megatech magazine praised the graphics and sound calling it "truly tremendous" and described the backgrounds as "sombre-looking as the sets in the film." And lauded the game’s soundtrack. The only criticism they had was the game being fairly easy to beat. The four reviewers of Electronic Gaming Monthly gave Batman very positive reviews praising the gameplay staying true to the movie and praised the graphics, music and sound effects and one reviewer opined the game is "The ultimate side scrolling action game for the genesis." They criticized the game being too easy and short.

See also
 List of Batman video games

References

External links

1990 video games
Action video games
Video games based on Batman films
Batman (1989 film series)
Beat 'em ups
Sega Genesis games
Sega Genesis-only games
Sunsoft games
Superhero video games
Video games based on films
Video games based on adaptations
Video games developed in Japan
Video games scored by Naoki Kodaka
Video games based on works by Tim Burton
Video games set in the United States